Fraser Preston (born 5 March 1999) is a football player who plays as a forward for Gainsborough Trinity.

Club career

Sheffield Wednesday
Preston joined the Owls academy at Under-14 level and has worked his way up the ranks impressing at both Under-18 and Under-23 level.
 
He made his first team debut for Sheffield Wednesday away to Brentford, where he replaced Sam Hutchinson at half time of their Championship defeat.

Non-league
On 19 September 2020, it was announced Preston had joined Boston United. His first season with Boston United, would end premature due to the season being declared null and void following the covid-19 pandemic and would finish the season with one goal from nine games. On 5 April 2021 he would sign for the 2021-22 season at Boston United.

On 8 July 2022, Preston signed for Alfreton Town.

On 15 November 2022, Preston joined Gainsborough Trinity for an undisclosed fee.

Career statistics

References

1999 births
Living people
Scottish footballers
Association football forwards
Boston United F.C. players
Sheffield Wednesday F.C. players
Alfreton Town F.C. players
Gainsborough Trinity F.C. players
English Football League players
National League (English football) players